Greek Money (foaled 1959 in Virginia) was an American Thoroughbred racehorse best known for winning the second leg of the U.S. Triple Crown series, the Preakness Stakes.

Background
Greek Money was a chestnut horse sired by Greek Song whose wins included the 1950 Arlington Classic. His dam was English mare Lucy Lufton, a daughter of Nimbus, the 1949 Epsom Derby winner. Greek Money was bred and raced by entities owned by Donald P. Ross, co-owner of Delaware Park Racetrack. He was trained by Buddy Raines.

Racing career
Greek Money had won three of his four starts going into the 1962 Preakness Stakes. Ridden by John Rotz, he defeated Ridan by a nose to win the Preakness.  Greek Money was made the betting favorite for the Belmont Stakes   but finished seventh to winner Jaipur. After that, he won only an allowance race in his next six starts. In 1963, his most important win of the year came in the Excelsior Handicap at New York's Aqueduct Racetrack. In 1964, Greek Money won the Pennycomequick Purse at Delaware Park Racetrack.

Stud record
As a sire, Greek Money met with limited success.

Breeding

References
 Greek Money's pedigree and partial racing stats
 Video at YouTube of Greek Money winning the 1962 Preakness Stakes

1959 racehorse births
Racehorses bred in Virginia
Racehorses trained in the United States
Preakness Stakes winners
Thoroughbred family 1-l